Cacotherapia flexilinealis is a species of snout moth in the genus Cacotherapia. It was described by Harrison Gray Dyar Jr. in 1905 and is known from the US state of Texas.

References

Cacotherapiini
Moths described in 1905